Vaiben Louis Solomon (13 May 1853 – 20 October 1908) was the 21st Premier of South Australia and a member of the first Australian Commonwealth parliament. He was generally known by his full name (perhaps to distinguish him from his uncle, Vaiben Solomon (1802 – 21 June 1860), who was transported with his brother Emanuel Solomon to New South Wales in 1818 for larceny and became a wealthy pastoralist of Horningsea Park).

History
Solomon was born in Adelaide, South Australia, the son of Judah Moss Solomon, a member of the South Australian Legislative Council and Lord Mayor of Adelaide from 1869 to 1870. His education began at J. L. Young's Adelaide Educational Institution, and continued at Scotch College, Melbourne. He then returned to Adelaide, where he was employed at the warehouse of Donaldson, Andrews and Sharland, and subsequently to the Solomon Cousins "Nimble Ninepence" shop in Kapunda, where he developed his talent for amateur theatricals. He returned to Adelaide, where he worked at the Stock Exchange. Vaiben wished to marry Mary Ann Wigzell ( – 7 January 1885), a Gentile, but his father forbade the marriage, going so far as to publish a notice to that effect.  In 1873 Solomon left for (perhaps sent by his father) the Northern Territory, where he became editor of the Northern Territory Times as well as holding successful mining and mercantile holdings. He helped run his brother Moss's Darwin store, then left to open his own, "Solomon's Emporium", which flourished while his brother's languished. He became an auctioneer in 1877, and had a business partnership with Frederick Percy Stevens and Herbert Henry Adcock in 1878. On 6 December 1880, three months after his father's death, Solomon married Wigzell, who was by then Mary Ann Bridgland, a widow with a young son; she died a little over four years later, having in the meantime had a daughter by Vaiben. Her two children were taken to Adelaide to be cared for by relatives.  He became a prominent figure in the Northern Territory, where he gained the nickname "Black Solomon" from the time when, on a dare, he painted himself black and walked naked (streaked?) through the streets of Palmerston (now known as Darwin). He had helped found Palmerston's first municipal council in 1874 and was later served as Chairman. He founded a building company and became quite prosperous, building for himself a residence on The Esplanade that was perhaps the grandest in the town.

Solomon was elected with colleague J. Langdon Parsons to the South Australian House of Assembly in April 1890 as the inaugural members for the Electoral district of Northern Territory (then part of South Australia) on the back of a campaign advocating a White Australia policy. Financial difficulties led to his resignation in March 1891, but his constituents brought him back and re-elected him at the next elections. He served as government whip before becoming Leader of the Opposition in 1899, when he had the Charles Kingston government dissolve over Kingston's proposal to extend suffrage to all householders and their wives. Solomon then became Premier and Treasurer of South Australia for one week, 1 December to 8 December 1899, before further machinations led to new Opposition Leader Frederick Holder gaining the Premiership, and gaining for Vaiben the cognomen "Sudden Solomon".

Solomon was a member of the Australian Federation Convention in 1897 and the Convention that framed the Australian Constitution in 1897–98, before his election to the inaugural Australian federal Parliament in 1901 as a Free Trade member for the single statewide Division of South Australia. Solomon unsuccessfully stood for the Division of Boothby at the 1903 election before returning to the South Australian House of Assembly in 1905 as the Member for the Northern Territory.  By the time of his death to cancer, Solomon was Deputy Leader of the Opposition. Solomon holds the dual distinctions of being South Australia's sole Jewish and shortest serving Premier.

Recognition
The Hundred of Solomon in South Australia and the Electoral Division of Solomon in the Northern Territory are named after him.

Family
V. L. Solomon (1853–1908) married the widow Mary Ann Bridgland (née Wigzell) (c. June 1856 – 7 January 1885) on 6 December 1880 in Darwin. He married again, to Alice Cohen ( – 19 May 1954) of Richmond, Victoria on 22 July 1896, and lived at "Beryl", Robe Terrace Medindie. His children were:
Mary Danks Solomon (10 September 1881 – 1 June 1952) born in Darwin, married financier D(avid) Leon Abraham ( – 24 April 1944) on 16 September 1903. She was awarded the Royal Humane Society's medal in 1894
Vaiben Louis "Vaib" Solomon (31 May 1897 – ) married Claribelle "Claire" Mitchell ( – ) on 31 March 1931. He was educated at St. Peter's College then Wesley College, Melbourne. As "Vaiben Louis" he won some fame as a humorous writer, and was commissioned by Hugh J. Ward, who had the rights to the "hit" farce Tons of Money to write a musical version, which had a successful run at Melbourne's Princess Theatre. In business as an accountant.
Esther Solomon MBE (6 April 1900 – 27 January 1991) married dentist Hyam John "Boy" Lipman (11 January 1889 – 16 March 1960) on 9 April 1919; she married a second time, to Harrold Cook. Her third marriage was to Sir Roland Ellis "Raoul" Jacobs (28 February 1891 – 28 June 1981) on 30 November 1970. Esther was the first woman elected to the Adelaide City Council and served two terms as Deputy Mayor.
Elizabeth Laura "Betty" Solomon (1908 – c. 2007) married Eric B. Fewster ( – ) c. 15 July 1930

He adopted Mary Ann's son Harrie Walter Bridgland (31 May 1879 – 17 October 1947), who for a time called himself Harrie Walter Solomon or Solomon-Bridgland, then disowned him in 1903. Harrie was a champion swimmer, as was his son Walter Lewis Bridgland (23 March 1908 – 30 July 1987), Lord Mayor of Adelaide 1966–1968.

For further details on Vaiben Louis Solomon's extended family, please refer to Samuel Moss Solomon.

See also
 Solomon Ministry
List of Jewish members of the Australian parliament

Notes

References
Australian Dictionary of Biography

External links

 

Premiers of South Australia
1853 births
1908 deaths
Australian people of English-Jewish descent
Jewish Australian politicians
Members of the Australian House of Representatives
Members of the Australian House of Representatives for Boothby
Members of the South Australian House of Assembly
People educated at Scotch College, Melbourne
Leaders of the Opposition in South Australia
Treasurers of South Australia
Free Trade Party members of the Parliament of Australia
People from Adelaide
19th-century Australian politicians
20th-century Australian politicians